Martina Navratilova defeated Chris Evert-Lloyd in the final, 6–2, 6–0 to win the singles tennis title at the 1983 Virginia Slims Championships. It was her fourth Tour Finals singles title.

Sylvia Hanika was the defending champion, but was defeated in the semifinals by Navratilova.

Seeds
A champion seed is indicated in bold text while text in italics indicates the round in which that seed was eliminated.

  Martina Navratilova (champion)
  Chris Evert-Lloyd (final)
  Andrea Jaeger (first round)
  Tracy Austin (quarterfinals)
  Pam Shriver (quarterfinals)
  Wendy Turnbull (first round)
  Bettina Bunge (quarterfinals)
  Sylvia Hanika (semifinals)

Draw

See also
WTA Tour Championships appearances

External links
 1983 Virginia Slims Championships Draw

WTA Tour Championships
1983 Virginia Slims World Championship Series